Live: Brixton Academy '85 is a live album by Pete Townshend. In 2004 Townshend released the complete 1985 Brixton Academy concert, including all of the songs that were on Deep End Live! plus the David Gilmour solo songs "Love On the Air" and "Blue Light", and other songs. The album was released 16 November 2004 in the UK through Eel Pie Recording Productions Ltd.

Track Listing

References

Pete Townshend live albums
1986 live albums